The Exchange Building  is a 23-story (275 ft) Art Deco office building located in the central business district of Seattle, Washington. It was designed to house the Seattle Stock Exchange by John Graham & Associates and completed in 1930.

John Graham, an English-born architect, also designed many other landmark Seattle buildings, including the downtown Frederick & Nelson (now Nordstrom), the downtown Bon Marché (now a Macy's), and the Dexter Horton Building.

At the time of its completion, the Exchange Building was the second-tallest reinforced concrete skyscraper in the United States. In addition to many of Seattle's commodity market exchanges, early tenants included General Electric, Standard Oil, Edison Lamp Works, and Underwriters Laboratories. Later tenants included Pacific Northwest Bell and King County Metro (formally Seattle Metro). As of 2016 major tenants include Slalom Consulting, Deloitte Digital, and Nuance Communications.

Landmark status was awarded April 20, 1990. The Exchange Building won the "Office Building of the Year" award from the Building Owners and Managers Association in 2002.

References

External links

Art Deco architecture in Washington (state)
Art Deco skyscrapers
Downtown Seattle
Landmarks in Seattle
Skyscraper office buildings in Seattle